Pierce Lake or Lake Pierce may refer to:
United States
Lake Pierce (Polk County, Florida)
Pierce Lake, a lake in Martin County, Minnesota
Pierce Lake, a lake in McLeod County, Minnesota
Pierce Lake, a man-made lake in Rock Cut State Park, Illinois
Pierce Lake (Montana), a lake in Missoula County, Montana
Canada
Pierce Lake (Ontario)
Pierce Lake (Saskatchewan)